Pop music is a genre of popular music that originated in its modern form during the mid-1950s in the United States and the United Kingdom. The terms popular music and pop music are often used interchangeably, although the former describes all music that is popular and includes many disparate styles. During the 1950s and 1960s, pop music encompassed rock and roll and the youth-oriented styles it influenced. Rock and pop music remained roughly synonymous until the late 1960s, after which pop became associated with music that was more commercial, ephemeral, and accessible.

Although much of the music that appears on record charts is seen as pop music, the genre is distinguished from chart music. Identifying factors usually include repeated choruses and hooks, short to medium-length songs written in a basic format (often the verse-chorus structure), and rhythms or tempos that can be easily danced to. Much pop music also borrows elements from other styles such as rock, urban, dance, Latin, and country.

Below are list of styles of pop music.

Stylistic origins

Traditional pop 

Traditional pop (also known as classic pop and pre-rock and roll pop) is Western popular music that generally pre-dates the advent of rock and roll in the mid-1950s. The most popular and enduring songs from this era of music are known as pop standards or American standards. The works of these songwriters and composers are usually considered part of the canon known as the "Great American Songbook". More generally, the term "standard" can be applied to any popular song that has become very widely known within mainstream culture.

AllMusic defines traditional pop as "post-big band and pre-rock & roll pop music".

Rock and roll 

Rock and roll (often written as rock & roll, rock 'n' roll, or rock 'n roll) is a genre of popular music that evolved in the United States during the late 1940s and early 1950s. It originated from black American music such as gospel, jump blues, jazz, boogie woogie, rhythm and blues, as well as country music. While rock and roll's formative elements can be heard in blues records from the 1920s and in country records of the 1930s, the genre did not acquire its name until 1954.

Earliest form 

Early pop music drew on the sentimental ballad for its form, gained its use of vocal harmonies from gospel and soul music, instrumentation from jazz and rock music, orchestration from classical music, tempo from dance music, backing from electronic music, rhythmic elements from hip-hop music, and spoken passages from rap.

Subgenres 
Below are genres that exclusively considered as subgenres of pop.

Note that music styles like dance, electronic, opera, and orchestra are not considered as standalone genres.

Art pop

Brill Building

Bubblegum

cringe pop

Dance-pop

Electropop

Operatic pop

Orchestral pop

Sad pop

Schlager

Sophisti-pop

Sunshine pop

Teen pop

Wonky pop

Fusion genres 
Below are styles of pop music that mixed with other standalone genres.

Ambient pop

Country pop

Dancehall pop

Folk-pop

Hip pop

House-pop 

House-pop (sometimes also called "pop-house") is a crossover of house and dance-pop music that emerged in early '90s. The genre was came for make house music more radio friendly. The characteristic of house-pop is similar to diva house music, like over-the-top vocal acrobatics, bubbly synth riffs, and four-on-the-floor rhythm. House-pop also has hip-hop influence.

Jazz pop 

Jazz pop (or pop-jazz, also called jazzy pop) is a pop music with jazz instruments, soft production, commercially viable, and radio-friendly. In jazz pop, the music has less improvisation, but retains the melody and swing of jazz. Robert Palmer from The New York Times cited that jazz pop should be distinguished from jazz rock. Examples of jazz-pop musicians are Kenny G, Bob James, and George Benson.

Pop-R&B

Pop rock

Baroque pop

Cowboy pop

Emo pop

Indie pop

Jangle pop

Pop metal

Pop punk

Power pop

Pop-soul 

Pop soul is a genre of soul music that has upbeat tempo and given a commercially viable, crossover production. The vocals are still raw, but the material and the sound of the record could easily fit onto pop radio stations' playlists. Motown was the pioneering label of pop soul, and through much of the 1960s, it was one of the most popular pop music genres. In the 1970s, pop soul became slicker, and it eventually metamorphosed into disco. Luther Vandross is an example of pop soul musician.

Beach

Psychedelic pop

Hypnagogic pop

Space age pop

Synth-pop

Worldbeat

Avant-garde related genres 
Below are pop music that related to avant-garde culture.

Experimental pop

Hyperpop

Industrial pop

Noise pop

Progressive pop

Regional scenes and subgenres

Popular music scenes

Other related genres

Contemporary Christian music

Motown

New wave

Rock music

Smooth jazz

Smooth soul

Other genres 
Below are 'pop' genres that are not considered as pop musics.

Avant-pop

Bitpop

Britpop

Chamber pop

Dream pop

Futurepop

Swamp pop

References 

Pop music